Janaadhipan is an Indian Malayalam-language political thriller film written and directed by Thanseer M A, and starring Hareesh Peradi, Vinu Mohan and Anil Nedumangad. The soundtrack is composed by Mejo Joseph. The film began production in January 2018.

Cast 

 Hareesh Peradi as Kannur Vishwan
 Vinu Mohan as Anand
Hariprashanth MG as Gunda Saleem
 Anil Nedumangad as Monichan
 Sunil Sukhada as Bakkar
 Kottayam Pradeep as Sivadasan
 Tanuja Karthika as Nadiya
 Dinesh Panicker as Governor
 Maala Parvathy as Kshema 
Appunni Sasi as  Rajan 
Sreekumar  as Venu Saghavu
Avinash Natarajan as Niranjan
Suresh Kurup as Suresh
Balachandran Chullikkad as Swamy
Vijayan Karanthoor  as Hajiyaar
Dysp Rajkumar as DGP
Prakrithi as Arathy 
Sreekumar Mullasery as advocate
Renjith Govindamangalam as Ani
Alex Vallikkunnam as opposition leader
Kalyaani as Varalekshmi
Sujith A.K as villager
Arunnath Palode as villager 
Jose P Raphael as villager 
Harish Pengan as villager
Thampanoor Sheriff as Commissioner

Production 
Janaadhipan is directed by Thanseer M A for Devi Entertainments. The film, said to be a political thriller, revolves around a few tense days in the life of a communist Chief Minister of Kerala, who is played by Hareesh Peradi. The director has confirmed that the film has no connection to any person living or dead.

Music 
The music and background score of the film were composed by Mejo Joseph.

Track listing

References

External links 

 

2019 films
Indian political thriller films
2010s Malayalam-language films